Buuhoodle, also known as Bohotle, is the second largest city in the Togdheer region of Somalia and also the capital of the Cayn region under Puntland. It is a prominent border town for movements of goods to and from Somalia and the Somali Region of Ethiopia. The surrounding district is rich in both livestock and fledgeling agriculture.

Territorial dispute

Buuhoodle which is the second most important city for the Dhulbahante after Las Anod is under the control of local unionist militia. Despite attempts the 2021 Somaliland parliamentary and municipal elections did not take place in the city.

The city is disputed by Puntland and Somaliland. The former bases its claim due to the kinship ties between the Dhulbahante clan and the dominant clan in Puntland, the Majeerteen. Whilst the later's claim is grounded on the border of the former British Somaliland Protectorate. The city was the de facto capital of Khatumo State throughout its existence until its dissolvement in 2017. 

A conflict ensued in the vicinity of Buuhoodle between Somaliland and SSC Movement troops in 2010 and again in 2012. The conflict which became known as the Kalshale conflict was at first a clan skirmish but quickly escalated to involve the two administrations. It  was eventually resolved in early 2012, with the official withdrawal of Somaliland troops to a 50 km radius of the city's perimeter.

Geography
Physiographically, Buuhoodle is located in Ciid, and geopolitically, on the border between Somalia and Ethiopia.

Politics
Buuhoodle is the capital of the Cayn region which was carved out of the Togdheer region and encompasses the majority of Buuhoodle District.

In June 2014, the Puntland government launched a new tree-planting campaign in the state, with the regional Ministry of Environment, Wildlife and Tourism slated to plant 25,000 trees by the end of the year. Buuhoodle is among the 5 cities and towns earmarked for the reforestation initiative, which also include Garowe, Bosaso, Qardho, and Galkayo. The campaign is part of a broader partnership between the Puntland authorities and EU to set up various environmental protection measures in the region, with the aim of promoting reforestation and afforestation.

History

Dervish period

The Dervish Movement emerged in Buuhoodle and localities in its vicinity. According to a contemporaneous news report from The Marion Star, the Bah Ali Gheri, were the first people to adopt the Dervish identity; as such, making the Bah Ali Gheri onelings the founders of the Dervish:

The Bah Ali Geri, a clan in the south of Buuhoodle, were the people whom hosted the Sayid Mohamed during the fledgling moments of the Dervish in the 19th century:

British intelligence reports also claimed that the Bah Ali Geri clan were the earliest or old allies of the Mad Mullah (Sayid Muhammad Abdullah Hassan):

In the oldest surviving work on Dervishes, Malcolm Mcneill states the two largest subclans in Buuhoodle, the Bah Ali Gheri and Ararsame were the main opponents of European colonialism:

As a consequence of their anti-colonialism, 1200 Ararsame and Bah Ali Gheri clansmen were killed and their livestock embezzled:

James Hayes Sadler stated that the primary base of Dervish support came from Buuhoodle:

Eric Swayne stated that the people of Buuhoodle had "always proved to be the backbone" of adherence to Dervishnimo.

In 1904, a disease similar to smallpox was reported in a black unit of the British Army in Buuhoodle.

Dervish raids 
1912 was a tumultuous year for the Dhulbahante clans inhabiting Bohotle and the Ain valley. The clans of Bohotle being allies of the British Empire, were set upon and attacked by Hassan and his Dervish army, forcing them to evacuate and seek refuge in Burao, Berbera and Haud among the Isaaq clans. British colonial governor Horace Byatt reported that 800 Dhulbahante refugees arrived in Berbera, but feared that they could not be protected nor fed properly, stating that only 300 native infantry and 200 King's African Rifles were in Berbera and insufficient to hold off a Dervish attack. Byatt also raised concerns for the Dhulbahante refugees en route to British controlled territory and the possibility of them being looted by hostile clans, particularly the Habr Yunis.

Baron Ismay's intelligence report on the Dervish raids on the Bah Ali Gheri and the Dolbahanta clan's of Bohotle

No important move was made till November 1911, when he successfully attacked the Ali gheri at Bohotleh. He followed this up in February 1912 with an attack on the Dolbahanta at Eildab, In this engagement our people lost all their stock and were reduced to starvation. They flocked to Berbera demanding to be supported. Yet another attack on Bohotleh in March resulted in the remaining Dolbahanta in that vicinity being looted and driven out. Bohotleh remained in Dervish hands.

British colonial administrator Sir Douglas Jardine describing the plight of the Dhulbahante writes :

<blockquote> The most pitiful lot of all fell to certain sections of the Dolbahanta. Ousted from their ancestral grazing grounds by the Mullah's advance and bereft of all their stock, the remnants wandered like veritable Ishmaelites in the Ishaak country, deprived of Asylum and almost all access to the coast.</blockquote>

These conditions were not limited to the Dhulbahante only but encompassed the entire territory of British Somaliland Protectorate. The British retreat to coastal outposts left the interior country in a state of power vacuum that heralded a period acute distress, scarcity and violence that came to be known locally as Xaaraame Cune'' "time of eating filth". An estimated one third of the entire population of Somaliland perished during this period.

Until Somalia's Independence
According to 1937 records, the soil around Buhoodle is gray red sand with rocky patches, but many grasses, mostly Dalemo (Andropogon aucherii), grow in the area, which is a large meadow interspersed with dense bushes.

After the Somali Civil War
Prior to 1999, neither Somaliland nor Puntland was involved in the administration of Buhoodle.

In November 2000, an armed clash between two sub-tribes of the Dhulbahante clan occurred in Buhoodle, killing four people.

In October 2001, the Puntland government claimed Sool, Eastern Sanaag, Bari, Northern Mudug, Nugal and the district of Buuhoodle as its territory.

In October 2001, Buhoodle entered the rainy season, but the drought conditions in the pastures did not improve.

In August 2002, the Somaliland Armed Forces established a military division and a new commander in the combined area of Sool and Buhoodle districts.

In November 2004, a major drought occurred over a large area, including Buhoodle.

In October 2007, fighting broke out between Somaliland and Puntland forces in Ras Anod and many residents fled in the direction of Garoowe, Buuhoodle, Kalabaydh and Hawdka.

SSC and Somaliland
In 2009, the SSC established a government based in Buhoodle, which confronted Puntland and Somaliland.

In May 2010, at least 13 people were killed in fighting between Somalis and Ethiopian forces in Buhoodle.

In July 2010, thousands of Buhoodle residents were displaced due to clashes between SSC and Somaliland forces.

In August 2010, the SSC refused to sign a ceasefire agreement with Somaliland.

In August 2010, both the Somaliland government and the SSC rejected the peace agreement reached between the Burao elders and the Buhoodle elders.

In 2011, SSC collapsed due to internal conflicts.

Khatumo and Somaliland

In January 2012, fighting broke out between local militias and Somaliland forces in Buhoodle. At the end of January, there was talk that Ethiopia was cooperating with these local militias, but the Somaliland Foreign Minister denied it.

In February 2012, fighting between Somaliland and Khatumo forces resulted in civilian deaths and some residents were displaced.

In April 2012, fighting broke out between pro-Khatumo militias and Somaliland forces.

In February 2014, Somaliland forces occupied the villages of Kalabaydh, Karindabaylweyn,

Xamar lagu xidh, and others, preventing Puntland Vice President Abdihakim Abdullahi Haji Omar from visiting his native Buhoodle.

In April 2014, severe drought damage occurred in the Buhoodle area.

In December 2014, the Somaliland Ministry of Finance established a customs office in Buhoodle, which generated significant revenue.

In September 2015, the Puntland Ministry of Health, in collaboration with the Food and Agriculture Organization, began vaccinating 100,000 goats in the Buhoodle district and neighboring areas.

In October 2015, Garaad Abdulahi Garaad Soofe and others met in Buuhoodle.

In December 2015, Puntland Vice President Abdihakim Abdullahi Haji Omar visited Buuhoodle.

In January 2016, Somaliland and Khatumo forces fought in Buuhoodle district.

Recent history
In April 2016, armed militias against the Khatumo State reportedly rose up in Buuhoodle.

In February 2017, troops supporting President Farmaajo led by Cabdifataax Is-diid occupy Buuhoodle; Is-diid states that he supports neither Somaliland nor Khatumo.

In August 2017, inter-clan fighting broke out in Buuhoodle.

On August 1, 2018, a suicide bomber blew himself up in Buuhoodle, identified as Abdifatah Mohamed Ali, who previously worked in the government of Prime Minister Omar Sharmarke, and Ahmed Mohamed Dolal, who previously served as Interior Minister in the Khatumo government.

In September 2019, officers stationed in Buuhoodle said they belong to Puntland and not Somaliland.

In October 2019, the Puntland government announced the 25 members of the Buuhoodle District Council.

In December 2019, a group called SSC was formed in Buuhoodle as a unification of Sool, Sanaag, and Cayn. The next day, The Minister of public works and Housing of Somaliland, Abdirashid Haji Duale, called on residents to non-cooperate with the SSC, saying the Buuhoodle rebels are an attempt by the group to profit from the war.

In May 2020, the Minister of Insurance of the Federal Republic of Somalia visited Buuhoodle by plane to deliver medical supplies against COVID-19.

In 2020, logistics from Buuhoodle to Las Anod and Burao were halted due to inter-clan conflict.

In June 2021, the Buuhoodle mayoral election was held in Widhwidh and Khadija Ahmed Yussuf of the Kulmiye Party was elected. Khadija became the first female mayor elected by majority vote. Note that no voter registration was conducted in the urban area of Buuhoodle.

In January 2023, Buuhoodle representative Somaliland MP supported the Somaliland government regarding the riots in Las Anod and criticized forces opposing Somaliland.

Economy 
It serves as a commercial hub for the movement of goods to and from Bosaso, Garowe, Las Anod, Galkayo, Wardheer, Burao, the surrounding area, and the Ogaden.

The Puntland government has imposed tariffs on goods coming from the former British Somaliland, but not on goods from Badhan and Buhoodle, which are not under Somaliland's control.

The Somaliland government has set up a customs office in Las Anod to apply tariffs on goods from Puntland. However, the tariff is reduced to 40 percent for a 60-kilometer radius around Las Anod, and Buhoodle is included in the reduced tariff area.

Demographics
As of 2014 the broader Buuhoodle District had a estimated population of 83,747 residents. Buuhoodle is primarily inhabited by people from the Somali ethnic group, with the clan eponyms of Ararsame and Bah Ali Gheri of Dhulbahante especially well-represented.

Education
Buuhoodle has a number of academic institutions. According to the Puntland Ministry of Education, there are 12 primary schools, 3 high schools and 2 universities in the Buuhoodle District. Among these are H/dh Abu-Bakar Sadiq, H/dh Al-Najax, H/dh Al-Furqan and so on. Secondary schools in the area include Howd and Samatar Bahman.

For health education, there is Buhodle College Of Health Science.

For higher studies, Buuhoodle is served by the East Africa University (EAU). The institution opened a seventh branch in the town on 18 April 2012 to serve pupils from the Cayn region.

Notable residents
Abdihakim Abdullahi Haji Omar – Vice President of Puntland
Mohammed Abdullah Hassan – Leader of the Dervish
Saado Ali Warsame – Singer & MP in the Federal Parliament of Somalia
Ismail Mire - Somali poet and Dervish movement general
Ali Dhuh - Somali poet
Saleban Essa Ahmed 'Xaglatoosiye' - Somaliland Minister of Health & former SSC militia leader

References

External links
Buuhoodle, Somalia

Ethiopia–Somaliland border crossings
Territorial disputes of Somalia
Border crossings of the Darawiish
Populated places in Togdheer